USS Mary B. Garner (SP-682) was a United States Navy minesweeper in commission from 1917 to 1919.

Mary B. Garner was built as a commercial fishing vessel of the same name by the William E. Woodall Company at Baltimore, Maryland, in 1912. On 30 April 1917, the U.S. Navy purchased her from the Coast Fish Oil and Guano Company of Lewes, Delaware, for use during World War I. Assigned the section patrol number 682, she was commissioned on 12 May 1917 as USS Mary B. Garner (SP-682).

Assigned to the Minesweeping Squadron of the 4th Naval District and based at Philadelphia, Pennsylvania, Mary B. Garner carried out minesweeping duties in the rivers, harbors, and coastal waters of Pennsylvania, Delaware, New Jersey, and Maryland. She ran aground and was wrecked on 11 April 1918 at Prime Hook Beach, Delaware, with the loss of one life, but she was salvaged and returned to her duties for the rest of World War I.

Mary B. Garner was decommissioned at Philadelphia on 15 May 1919.

References

Department of the Navy Naval History and Heritage Command Online Library of Selected Images: U.S. Navy Ships -- Listed by Hull Number "SP" #s and "ID" #s -- World War I Era Patrol Vessels and other Acquired Ships and Craft numbered from SP-600 through SP-699
NavSource Online: Section Patrol Craft Photo Archive Mary B. Garner (SP 682)

Minesweepers of the United States Navy
World War I minesweepers of the United States
Ships built in Baltimore
1912 ships
Maritime incidents in 1918
Shipwrecks of the Delaware coast